Demetrius "Tree" Treadwell (born 10 November 1991) is an American professional basketball player for Piratas de Quebradillas of the Puerto Rican Baloncesto Superior Nacional (BSN). He played college basketball for the Akron Zips, before playing professionally in Argentina, Israel, and France. In 2017–18, he was the top rebounder in the Israel Basketball Premier League.

Early life and college career
Treadwell attended Euclid High School in Euclid, Ohio, where he averaged 22.9 points, 16.6 rebounds, 5.0 blocks, 3.3 assists and 2.2 steals per game as a senior. Treadwell earned second team, All-Ohio honors.

Treadwell played college basketball for University of Akron's Zips, where he led the Zips to win the 2013 MAC tournament and was named the Finals MVP in his sophomore year.

In his junior year at Akron, he averaged 15.1 points, 8.6 rebounds and 1.8 assists per game, becoming the first Zip to average at least 15 points and 8 rebounds since Mark Alberts in 1992–93. On March 10, 2014, Treadwell was earned a spot in the All-MAC First-team.

Professional career

Argentina (2015)
On January 16, 2015, Treadwell started his professional career with Argentinian team Estudiantes Concordia, signing for the rest of the season. On March 24, 2015, Treadwell recorded a career-high 32 points, shooting 12-of-16 from the field, along with 10 rebounds in a 94–64 win over Estudiantes de Bahía Blanca.

Israel (2015–2018)
On August 26, 2015, Treadwell signed a one-year deal with the Israeli team Hapoel Gilboa Galil of the Israeli National League. In 35 games played for Gilboa Galil, he averaged a double-double of 20.2 points and 10.2 rebounds per game. That season, Treadwell won the National League championship with Gilboa Galil, alongside his teammates Jason Siggers and Joaquin Szuchman.

On August 25, 2016, Treadwell signed with Hapoel Afula for the 2016–17 season.

On July 18, 2017, Treadwell signed a one-year deal with Hapoel Eilat of the Israeli Premier League. On May 7, 2018, Treadwell recorded a season-high 23 points, shooting 9-of-15 from the field, along with 14 rebounds and 3 blocks in a 74–69 win over Maccabi Tel Aviv. Treadwell helped Eilat reach the 2018 Israeli League Playoffs, where they eventually lost to Hapoel Holon. He finished the season as the Israeli League leading rebounder (9.2 per game) and also averaged 12.9 points and 2 assists per game.

France (2018–2019)
On July 20, 2018, Treadwell signed with the French team Nanterre 92 for the 2018–19 season. Treadwell helped Nanterre reach the 2019 Champions League Quarterfinals, where they eventually were eliminated by Virtus Bologna.

Return to Israel (2019–2020)
On July 1, 2019, Treadwell returned to Israel for a second stint, signing a one-year deal with Hapoel Tel Aviv. On November 8, 2019, Treadwell has been ruled out for the rest of the season after breaking his tibia during a practice.

Lithuania (2021)
On January 17, 2021, he has signed with CBet Prienai of the Lithuanian Basketball League. Treadwell played three games and averaged 2.7 points and 2.3 rebounds per game.

Return to Israel (2021–2022)
On September 20, 2021, Treadwell signed with Hapoel Ramat Gan Givatayim of the Liga Leumit.

Puerto Rico (2022–present)
On May 2, 2022, he has signed with Piratas de Quebradillas of the Puerto Rican Baloncesto Superior Nacional (BSN).

References

External links
Akron Zips bio
RealGM profile
Eurobasket.com profile
SB Nation profile

1991 births
Living people
American expatriate basketball people in Argentina
American expatriate basketball people in France
American expatriate basketball people in Israel
American expatriate basketball people in Lithuania
American men's basketball players
Akron Zips men's basketball players
Basketball players from Cleveland
BC Prienai players
Centers (basketball)
Estudiantes Concordia basketball players
Hapoel Afula players
Hapoel Eilat basketball players
Hapoel Gilboa Galil Elyon players
Hapoel Tel Aviv B.C. players
Nanterre 92 players
Power forwards (basketball)